Genco Gulan ( (born 1969 in Turkey) is a contemporary conceptual artist and theorist, who lives and works in Istanbul. His transmedia contextual work involves painting, found objects, new media, drawings, sculpture, photography, performance and video. His work often carries political, social and/or cultural messages. He describes his work as idea art.

Genco Gulan studied Media at The New School, New York. His art has appeared at Pera Museum, Museu de Arte Moderna do Rio de Janeiro, ZKM Karlsruhe, Triennale di Milano, Biennial of Tehran and Pompidou Center Paris. Gulan has had solo shows at Gallery Artist in Berlin, Istanbul; State Painting and Sculpture Museums in Ankara, Izmir; Foto Gallery Lang, Zagreb and Artda Gallery, Seoul among other places.

Art

Genco uses text, codes and even his own DNA in his art. He is a conceptual, contextual new media artist, developing theory as well as practice. He specializes in not knowing what everybody else knows. Genco Gulan believes in the artistic future of bio-technology, artificial intelligence, and digital communication. In a video piece called Grundig, he filmed a female swim team playing rugby underwater with a TV monitor."If it's not new, it's just media," says Gulan in regards to the importance of novelty. His experimental works include net-art, web art, A.I.gen (generated) images, Robot Games, SCIgen papers and online videos. Genco uses boron in his sculptures.

After years of work and experience, Genco Gülan's exhibition Untitled is a résumé of his adventure in conceptual colors of contemporary art. The gallery space  (EKAV Foundation, Istanbul) was used in a manner that allowed all artworks "to talk" with each other apart from their unique placement, preventing monotony. Different mediums were being used with a variety of measurements, colors and display styles. Axles, like arteries, feeding the ease of legibility around which the exhibition revolves. Therefore the focal point of Untitled is the concept of meaning. Each artwork has its meaning however, even though they belong to different series or they were made in different mediums, create a bigger and much intense chunk of information. The exhibition holding layers of information, ready to be interpreted by the viewer, divided into all works was brought into light in 21 January 2014.

WorksThe Android Statue of Genco Gülan was exhibited in Antalya Archeology Museum 12–20 March 2014. In the exhibition, the sketches of his kinetic marble statue series, called "Robotic Statues" were also presented. Genco Gülan gives references to archaeology; he even produces new media artworks. His art tries to predict the future of both sculpture as a discipline and humanity in general. Gülan has been working on robots in the labs of different universities since the middle of 1990's. He uses hardware and software of robots in many art projects. For example The artwork titled Robots, Football and War (RFW) of Gülan that consists of physical robots, was part of a computer game "Balkan Wars" that won a prize from European Media Art Festival, Osnabrück in 1995. His play written by artificial intelligence (AI) robots was used in the project YEN! (New), presented in Pera Museum, for 16th Istanbul Theatre Festival.

Gülan's site-specific installation, The Great Conjugation, was exhibited at Boğaziçi University's Faculty of Economics and Administrative Sciences building, Washburn Hall through May and June 2014. After 23 years, the artist returned to the building where he completed his undergraduate studies. This time he tied the twin towers of the historical building together from inside. The project which changes and transforms depending upon the location was not displayed in a museum but this time in an academic institution. Gülan's The Great Conjugation used approximately 1000 ties for this installation. All of the connected ties created a route tens of meters long and the line flowed through the all five floors of the building. The ties connected the twin towers of the building from the inside which was built in 1906. During the exhibition Gülan invited the viewers to bring their ties and add them to the installation to generate a second level of participation. Gülan's work of art is not descriptive, it does not involve just one explanation. Both the objects that are used and the space-time relationship between them give a range of meaning to the piece. What Gülan tries to do is to constitute new semantic connections and summon new connotations by using the association of ideas. While he is doing that he claims the role of 'playmaker' and tries to be almost out of the picture. Even if the method is referring to Nicolas Bourriaud's concept of relational aesthetics, the soft sculpture that came to life is more plastic and political among its contemporaries. The ties used in the project have different colors, designs, brands and they were made in different countries. They were gathered from hundreds of domestic and abroad donators. The ties some of which are silk, nylon and wool conjugate and become a whole. The same ties were exhibited and greatly appreciated by viewers in The Thessaloniki State Museum of Contemporary Art and  Ankara Contemporary Art Center in 2013. At the first display in Istanbul, they were attached with a crane to a skyscraper and raised 160 meters from the ground. Genco Gülan was selected as a finalist at Sovereign Art Foundation European Art Prize in 2011. He had opened his first exhibition at White Saloon inside the Faculty of Economics and Administrative Sciences building where he had also taken many courses while he was studying at the Department of Political Science and International Relations between 1987 and 1991. 'The Great Conjugation' project happened with the contributions of Ayşe Gül Toker and the Faculty Secretary Hatıra Şenkon.

A solo show named Swimming Rocks which was on exhibit on 27 June 2014 at the Art Gallery of Kırmızı Ardıç Kuşu, Gallery Metazori in Çeşme, Alaçatı where Gülan spent most of his childhood is not only the name of the exhibition, but also one of the significant artworks in the exhibition. The "swimming rocks" in question are pumice rocks which can float on the sea and which are found in the Aegean Sea, especially in Çeşme and Alaçatı inspiring the artist in this process. Gülan made a sculpture, named Swimming Rocks from these and other stones; therefore this and some other sculptural pieces float on the sea and in the gallery. He made floating figurative, human-sized sculptures covered with stone. The artworks of Genco Gülan's mother, Tezer Gülan and his grandmother, Saime İzmiroğlu where also exhibited in the show. Genco Gülan had also a series called New Landscape in this exhibition. This series, being a conceptual/electronic interpretation of landscapes as barcodes, deals with questions such as how landscape pictures change in time, how different landscapes became now and how the landscapes in the future will become. Gülan juxtaposed classical landscape paintings, barcodes and produced new pieces. Gülan also exhibited his new series; Digital Ghost in the show. The artist painted on large canvases; the non-existing images that appeared in his formatted laptop.

Museum
As an art project in 1997, Genco Gulan established the first "Istanbul Contemporary Art Museum." 
"At first the Istanbul Contemporary Art Museum developed as an art series in the manner of Duchamp and Broodthaers until the end of the 1990s. Later it evolved when it was transferred to the Internet. It turned into a new age institution that organized exhibitions, workshops and provided logistic support on cyber space."

For almost a decade, the museum ran an unorthodox residency program called "I live in a Museum" and hosted artists from the U.S., the Netherlands, Spain, and China at its Galata location.
After the Istanbul location closed, Genco Gulan, in Berlin, manifested himself as a Museum.

Gulan's monograph; "Conceptual Colors" edited by Marcus Graf, is co-published by Revolver Publishing in Berlin in collaboration with Artist Istanbul. His books are available at libraries such as the German National Library, SALT Istanbul, Metropolitan Museum of Art, Thomas J. Watson Library and the Haas Family Arts Library at Yale University. Gulan founded the Web Biennial at the turn of the century, served on the Board of Balkan Biennial in Thessaloniki, International Programming Committee of ISEA Singapore in 2008 and was a guest editor for Second Nature: International Journal of Creative Media. He was in the jury for Turgut Pura Art Prize in Izmir and teaches at Mimar Sinan Academy and Boğaziçi University.

Selected images

References

Bibliography
 Marcus Graf. Conceptual Colors of Genco Gulan, Revolver Publishing, 2012. 
 Marcus Graf. Genco Gulan: Kavramsal Renkler, Galata Perform Publishing, 2008. 
 Genco Gulan. Portrait of the Artist as the Young Man: (After James Joyce) CreateSpace Independent Publishing Platform, 2013. 
 Genco Gulan. De-constructing the Digital Revolution: Analysis of the Usage of the Term "Digital Revolution" in Relation with the New Technology'', LAP Lambert Academic Publishing (12 November 2009).

External links

 
 Official Web site gencogulan.com
 The Change in Art: Genco Gulan at TEDxModa
 Galeri Artist, Istanbul, Berlin.
 Banff Centre, Banff, Canada.
 Rhizome, at the New Museum, NY.
 Java Museum, Koeln interview. 
 Istanbul Contemporary Art Museum
 Official website of the Web Biennial
 LABS : Leonardo ABstracts Service
 The King beheading himself. Written by Sabine Küper on 21 June 2013.
 Goethe Institute
 Saatchi Online
 Review by Nancy Atakan, Phd. 
 Review by Marcus Graf at Visual Art Beat Magazine. 
 Employee of the Month
 Turkish Culture and Art
 Identity as a Myth, article by Dr. Graf

Turkish video artists
BioArtists
Postmodern artists
Turkish conceptual artists
Contemporary painters
Institutional Critique artists
Installation artists
Conceptual photographers
Artists from New York (state)
Turkish performance artists
Net.artists
Mass media theorists
Futurologists
1969 births
21st-century Turkish sculptors
Living people
20th-century Turkish sculptors
20th-century Turkish male artists
21st-century Turkish male artists